"Reggaetón Lento (Bailemos)" is a song by Latin American boy band CNCO. It was released on October 7, 2016, as the third single from their debut studio album, Primera Cita (2016). The song was written by Eric Perez, Jadan Andino, Jorge Class and Yashua Camacho. The video has received over 1.5 billion views on YouTube as of April 2019. It was announced on August 16, 2017, that the band would release a re-recorded English-language remix of the song with British girl group Little Mix.

Music video 
The song's music video was released along with the single. The clip sees the boys playing at a bowling alley and meeting and trying to impress some girls. It also features scenes of the group performing the song with choreography and solo shots of the guys singing their individual parts. The music video reached one billion views in August 2017, making them the first boy band and non-English group to achieve the feat.

Charts

Weekly charts

Year-end charts

Certifications

Release history

Little Mix remix

CNCO recorded an English language remix of the song with British girl group Little Mix. It was released on August 18, 2017 through Sony Music and Syco Music. The remix version is included on the reissue of Little Mix's fourth studio album, Glory Days: The Platinum Edition (2017) and CNCO's self-titled second studio album (2018) as the second single.

"Reggaetón Lento (Remix)" is a reggaeton and latin pop song, with lyrics that addresses themes of love and romance. It received positive reviews from critics. A commercial success, the song topped the charts in Romania, Bulgaria, Sweden, and Slovenia. It reached number five in the United Kingdom, becoming CNCO's first top ten single and Little Mix's twelfth. It reached the top ten of the charts in eleven other territories including Finland, Hungary, and Lebanon.  

The song received its debut performance during the final on The X Factor UK, in 2017. The song won "Best Remix" at the 2018 iHeartRadio Music Awards. It has since received two double, one triple, four gold, and two platinum music certifications.

Background and release
The collaboration was announced a day before the release on the social media accounts of both groups, with Billboard magazine claiming it would be "huge".

Music video
The music video to the remix was released on September 18, 2017, on Little Mix's Vevo YouTube channel. It was directed by Marc Klasfeld and is set in a club where the two groups dance across the floor from each other. As of June 2021 the music video has received over 300 million views on YouTube.

Live performances
Both groups debut the single for the first time on television during the X Factor series 14 final, on December 3, 2017. The song has since been performed on both of the groups' tours, including CNCO's self-titled world tour and Little Mix's Summer Hits Tour, The Glory Days Tour, LM5: The Tour and The Confetti Tour

Commercial performance
The song reached number one in Bulgaria, Sweden, Slovenia, and Romania, becoming Little Mix's first number-one single in those countries. In the United Kingdom the song debuted at number five on the Official UK Singles Chart, becoming CNCO first and Little Mix twelfth top ten hit there. 

Elsewhere the song reached the top ten in nine countries, including Finland, Lebanon, and the Netherlands. It peaked within the top twenty in Argentina, Ireland, Mexico, Spain, and Switzerland. It reached the top forty in five other territories and charted in a further ten additional countries including Germany, Brazil, and Canada. 

"Reggaetón Lento (Remix)" has become the sixteenth-best selling single in the United Kingdom by a girl group, and Little Mix's sixth most successful single there. The song has been certified triple platinum in Brazil, double platinum in the Netherlands and the United Kingdom, and has received one platinum and five gold music certifications in other countries.

Charts

Weekly charts

Year-end charts

Certifications

Release history

See also
List of Airplay 100 number ones of the 2010s

References

2016 songs
2016 singles
Spanish-language songs
CNCO songs
Little Mix songs
Number-one singles in Romania
Sony Music Latin singles
Songs about dancing
Songs about music
Music videos directed by Marc Klasfeld